David Paulsen is an American television screenwriter, director and producer best known for his work on 1980s prime time soap operas Dallas (1980–1985, 1986–1988), Knots Landing (1980–1981, 1985–1986), and Dynasty (1988–1989). He also wrote and directed the slasher films Savage Weekend (1976) and Schizoid (1980).

References

External links

Living people
American male screenwriters
American soap opera writers
American television producers
American male television writers
Year of birth missing (living people)